Augusta High School may refer to:

In the United States 
Augusta High School (Arkansas), Augusta, Arkansas
Augusta High School (Kansas), Augusta, Kansas
Augusta High School (Kentucky), Augusta, Kentucky
Augusta High School (Montana), Augusta, Montana
North Augusta High School, North Augusta, South Carolina
Augusta High School (Wisconsin), Augusta, Wisconsin